Ryan Brobbel (born 5 March 1993) is a professional footballer who plays as a winger for Welsh Premier League club The New Saints.

Brobbel signed a professional contract with Middlesbrough in 2011 after progressing through their youth system. He had two loan spells with York City in the 2013–14 season and played for them in the League Two play-offs. He had a loan spell with Hartlepool United in late 2014 and was released by Middlesbrough in May 2015.

Early life
Brobbel was born in Hartlepool, County Durham and attended High Tunstall College of Science.

Club career

Brobbel started his career with the youth system of Middlesbrough and signed a three-year professional contract with the club on 1 May 2011 after finishing his apprenticeship. He joined League Two club York City on 30 August 2013 on a one-month loan, making his debut the following day as a 74th-minute substitute for Ashley Chambers in a 2–1 defeat away to Exeter City. Brobbel scored his first career goal in the second minute of the following match at home to Mansfield Town on 14 September 2013 with a header from six yards, although York went on to lose 2–1. On 27 September 2013, after making three appearances and scoring one goal for York, Brobbel's loan was extended to 5 January 2014. York opted against extending his loan when it expired, having made 13 appearances and scored three goals for the club. Brobbel rejoined York on 27 March 2014 on loan until the end of the 2013–14 season, following an injury to Josh Carson, and made his second debut for the club two days later in a 0–0 home with Burton Albion. He played in York's 1–0 home defeat to Fleetwood Town in the play-off semi-final first leg, but did not play in the second leg, after which York were eliminated 1–0 on aggregate. He made eight appearances and scored one goal in his second spell with York.

Brobbel signed a new one-year contract with Middlesbrough in July 2014, before joining League Two club Hartlepool United, his hometown club, on a one-month loan on 8 August. He made his debut as a seventy-sixth-minute substitute in a 1–0 away defeat to Stevenage on 9 August 2014, and having impressed the loan was extended for a second month in September. Another one-month extension came in October 2014, before being sent back to Middlesbrough by new Hartlepool manager Paul Murray in early November having made 17 appearances for the club. Brobbel struggled to get into Middlesbrough's under-21 team after returning, with manager Paul Jenkins saying that Brobbel was "at a crossroads in his career". He had trials with League One clubs Doncaster Rovers and Scunthorpe United, scoring two goals for Scunthorpe in a reserve-team match in April 2015. He was a member of the Middlesbrough under-21 team that won the Under-21 Premier League Division 2 and North Riding Senior Cup, but was released in May 2015 after a 15-year association with the club.

Brobbel trained with Northern Premier League Premier Division club Darlington 1883 in the summer of 2015, before going on trial with Torquay United of the National League. He signed for Darlington 1883, and made his debut in a 2–1 home win over Ramsbottom United on 9 September 2015. He went on trial with a club in Scotland, before he left Darlington in early-October 2015. Brobbel joined Darlington's Northern Premier League Premier Division rivals Whitby Town, and debuted a 78th-minute substitute in a 0–0 away draw with Halesowen Town on 3 October 2015.

On 1 February 2016, Brobbel signed for Welsh Premier League champions The New Saints.

International career
Brobbel is eligible to represent England, the Republic of Ireland and Northern Ireland at international level, and has been on training camps with both Irish teams. He played for the Northern Ireland national under-17, under-18 and under-19 teams before making his debut for the under-21 team in a 3–0 away defeat against Malta on 30 May 2013. His first goal for the under-21s came in a 2–1 home defeat to Serbia in a 2015 UEFA European Under-21 Championship qualification match on 9 September 2014. He earned nine caps and scored one goal for the under-21s from 2013 to 2014.

Career statistics

Honours
The New Saints
Welsh Premier League/ Cymru Premier: 2015–16, 2016–17, 2017–18, 2018–19, 2021–22
Welsh Cup: 2015–16
Welsh League Cup: 2016–17, 2017–18
Welsh Cup runner-up: 2016–17

Individual
 Welsh Premier League Team of the Year: 2016–17

References

External links

Ryan Brobbel profile at the New Saints F.C. website

1993 births
Living people
Footballers from Hartlepool
English footballers
Association footballers from Northern Ireland
Northern Ireland youth international footballers
Northern Ireland under-21 international footballers
Association football wingers
Middlesbrough F.C. players
York City F.C. players
Hartlepool United F.C. players
Darlington F.C. players
Whitby Town F.C. players
The New Saints F.C. players
English Football League players
Northern Premier League players
Cymru Premier players
English people of Northern Ireland descent